Thelosia minois is a moth in the Apatelodidae family. It was described by William Schaus in 1892. It is found in Brazil (Rio de Janeiro).

References

Natural History Museum Lepidoptera generic names catalog

Apatelodidae
Moths described in 1892
Moths of South America